Alisha Rai is an American author of contemporary, erotic, and paranormal romance novels. She advocates for greater diversity in the romance genre.

Career 
Prior to becoming a romance author, Rai worked as a lawyer. She began publishing her work in 2009, focusing on e-publishing. She shopped her books to traditional publishers, but she was repeatedly told that romances with non-white characters would not sell. Over her career, she expanded into different publishing methods. Her Forbidden Hearts series and her novel The Right Swipe are published through Avon Romance. Rai's book Serving Pleasure, was the first self-published book to appear on The Washington Post'''s annual list of best books of the year.

Rai includes protagonists from a variety of ethnicities. Her writing also explores the spectrum of sexual identity.

Rai is a vocal participant in the discussion of misrepresentation and under representation of minorities in traditionally published romance. During a racially charged dispute involving Romance Writers of America (RWA), Rai's comments on Twitter were widely quoted as a demonstration of the romance community's dissatisfaction with the organization. She was among a group of best-selling romance authors that demanded the resignation of Damon Suede, the RWA president-elect during the controversy.

Rai has been on the receiving end of online harassment.

 Themes 
Rai's book The Right Swipe explores aspects of modern dating, specifically online dating and dating apps, along with the contentious research into the effect of concussions on athletes. The book includes feminist and intersectional elements, with the heroine being a woman of color who is a CEO of a Silicon Valley company that employs a work force made up largely of women.

 Personal life 
Rai is of South Asian descent.

Rai began creating stories at the age of 13.

 Bibliography 

 Awards 

 2015 - Serving Pleasure - Washington Post Best Romance Novels of 2015
2017 - Hate to Want You'' - Entertainment Weekly's 10 best romance novels of 2017

References

External links 

Women erotica writers
American erotica writers
American paranormal romance writers
American people of South Asian descent
Living people
21st-century American women writers
20th-century American lawyers
Year of birth missing (living people)
20th-century American women lawyers